Nam Hang Mei or Ham Hang Mei is a village in the North District of Hong Kong.

See also
 Kai Kuk Shue Ha
 Kuk Po

External links
 Delineation of area of existing village Kai Kuk Shue Ha and Nam Hang Mei (Sha Tau Kok) for election of resident representative (2019 to 2022)

Villages in North District, Hong Kong